Philip Chaikin Sorensen (August 31, 1933February 12, 2017) was an American politician and law professor. He was the 27th lieutenant governor of Nebraska from 1965 to 1967.

Early life and education
Sorensen was born in Lincoln, Nebraska. He is the son of Christian A. Sorensen, a Danish American who was Nebraska Attorney General (1929–33), and Annis (Chaikin) Sorensen, who was of Russian Jewish descent. He earned both his undergraduate and law degrees from the University of Nebraska. Sorensen was admitted to the bar in Nebraska, Indiana, and Washington.

Political career
Sorensen was elected lieutenant governor in the 1964 election, defeating Republican Charles Thone (who later served in the US Congress and as governor).  He then ran for governor in 1966, but was defeated by Republican Norbert Tiemann.

Later career
Sorensen became a law professor at the Ohio State University. Courses he taught included: Torts, Business Organizations, Federal Income Tax, Legislation, and Nonprofit Organizations.

Personal life
In 1958, Sorensen married Janice Lichtenberger in Lincoln, Nebraska. They have four children and five grandchildren.

Sorensen, a sculptor for many years, displays his work at somesculpture.com

Sorensen died on February 12, 2017, at home in Columbus, Ohio.

References

}

1933 births
2017 deaths
Artists from Lincoln, Nebraska
Politicians from Lincoln, Nebraska
Nebraska lawyers
Indiana lawyers
Lawyers from Washington, D.C.
Members of the Universalist Church of America
American people of Danish descent
American people of Russian-Jewish descent
Lieutenant Governors of Nebraska
University of Nebraska alumni
Ohio State University faculty
Moritz College of Law faculty
20th-century American lawyers